Katrin Dörre-Heinig (Dörre, born 6 October 1961) is a former athlete from Germany, who competed mainly in the marathon. She won extensively on the road running circuit, having taken titles at races including the Tokyo Marathon, Berlin Marathon and the London Marathon; she won three times consecutively in London from 1992–1994.

Heinig was born in Leipzig, Bezirk Leipzig, and competed for East Germany at the 1988 Summer Olympics in Seoul, where she won the bronze medal in the classic race over 42.195 km. Dörre is a triple winner of the Osaka Ladies Marathon and has a record of 35 sub 2:34 times, with a personal best of 2:24:35 (1999, course record of the Hamburg Marathon). She was the bronze medallist in the marathon at the 1991 World Championships in Athletics and returned at the 1993 World Championships in Athletics, but managed only sixth place on her second attempt. She just missed out on the podium with a fourth-place finish in the marathon at the 1996 Summer Olympics

Since 1992 she has been married to her trainer Wolfgang Heinig. Her daughter, Katharina Heinig, has followed in her footsteps and she won the Köln Marathon in her debut over the marathon distance.

Over the course of her career she particaped in 45 marathons and won 24. She planned to run the Chicago marathon in 1985, but did not run there, to avoid a faceoff with Joan Benoit, Rosa Mota and Ingrid Kristiansen. Up to this point, she won 7 marathons in a row and went on to win 3 more.

In 2012, she started a coaching career.  she is the German national coach for marathon running.

Achievements
All results regarding marathon, unless stated otherwise

References

 
 

1961 births
Living people
Athletes from Leipzig
People from Bezirk Leipzig
German female long-distance runners
East German female marathon runners
Olympic athletes of East Germany
Olympic athletes of Germany
Athletes (track and field) at the 1988 Summer Olympics
Athletes (track and field) at the 1992 Summer Olympics
Athletes (track and field) at the 1996 Summer Olympics
World Athletics Championships athletes for Germany
Olympic bronze medalists for East Germany
Olympic bronze medalists in athletics (track and field)
Medalists at the 1988 Summer Olympics
World Athletics Championships medalists
Frankfurt Marathon female winners
London Marathon female winners
Tokyo Marathon female winners
Recipients of the Patriotic Order of Merit in silver